Hasanabad (also Romanized as Ḩasanābād and Ḩesanābād) is a village in Dehpir Rural District, in the Central District of Khorramabad County, Lorestan Province, Iran. At the 2006 census, its population was 419, in 91 families.

References 

Towns and villages in Khorramabad County